Ronald Tae Sok Kim (born May 2, 1979) is an American politician from New York City. He serves in the New York State Assembly representing the 40th District, which includes portions of Whitestone, Flushing, College Point, and Murray Hill in Queens. First elected in November 2012, Kim became the first Korean American elected in New York State. Speaker Carl Heastie appointed him as Vice-Chair of the Majority Conference of the New York State Assembly in January 2017 and Chair of Committee on Aging in January 2021

Early life and education
Kim comes from a Korean American family who immigrated to Queens when he was seven. The only child of Seo Jun Kim and Sun Hee Kim, he grew up in Flushing, Queens. He graduated from the Riverdale Country Day School in the Bronx in 1997, where he was captain of the football and track teams. He later earned his Bachelor of Arts from Hamilton College, where he continued his football career on the varsity team. He received his Masters in Public Administration from Baruch College as part of the National Urban Fellows Program.

Career
Kim began his career in public service in then-Councilmember John Liu’s office, focusing on quality-of-life issues in the Flushing community. He moved on to become an aide to then-State Assemblyman Mark Weprin. Following that, Kim joined the New York State Department of Buildings, followed by the Department of Small Business Services. In 2004, Kim was accepted into the National Urban Fellows Program, where he was placed in a fellowship advising the Chief Education Office of the Chicago Public Schools, simultaneously earning his Master’s in Public Administration from Baruch College.

In 2006, Kim joined the staff of then-New York City Council Speaker Christine Quinn as a Policy Analyst, where he focused on legislative issues relating to transportation, infrastructure, and economic development.

From 2007 through 2010, Kim served as a Regional Director for Government and Community Affairs in the administrations of Governors Eliot Spitzer and David A. Paterson, where he worked with state agencies, elected officials, and community organizations.

After leaving his position at the Governor’s office, Kim worked at the Parkside Group where he advocated on behalf of children with special needs, small business, community organizations, and vulnerable New Yorkers.

In June 2012, Kim announced that he would seek the State Assembly seat being vacated by Grace Meng, who was running for the U.S. House of Representatives. Kim won the five-way Democratic primary on September 13, and went on to defeat Republican Philip Gim in the general election, 68% to 32%.

On December 10, 2018, Kim announced that he would be seeking the New York City Public Advocate seat being vacated by Letitia James, who had been elected for New York State Attorney General. Running on a plan to end corporate welfare in what The Villager described as "one of the most jam-packed elections in recent memory," he and over a dozen other candidates entered a crowded race eventually won by then-Councilmember Jumaane Williams.

He endorsed Bernie Sanders for the 2020 Democratic Party presidential primaries. In 2021, he endorsed Andrew Yang for mayor of New York City.

State Assembly
In his first month in office, Kim helped pass legislation (A.3354) which implemented tax relief for New York City homeowners; the bill was projected to encourage housing development.

He has supported bills related to education issues and services for seniors. He is also an active supporter of immigration issues and is a sponsor of the DREAM Act on the state level as well as the prime sponsor on a bill to make Lunar New Year an allowable school holiday in New York City, a measure which the mayor eventually adopted. Kim has sponsored legislation inspired by events that happen in his district; in January 2013, he became a proponent of the Taxi Drivers Protection Act following a robbery and assault that occurred in Brooklyn.

Kim currently chairs the Committee on Aging and sits on the Education Committee; the Corporations, Authorities and Commissions Committee; Governmental Operations Committee; and Housing Committee. He is the co-founder of the New York State Asian Pacific American Task Force, and also a member of the Black, Puerto Rican, Hispanic and Asian Caucus.

Kim was the first public official to lead the opposition against Amazon HQ2. His policy stance lead to a larger discussion around corporate subsidies, economic development, and the rate of return for such investments.

Tackling debt 
In October 2018, he authored a white paper called “Gut-Checking Democracy” in which he outlined this thesis and presented several policy solutions. His legislative record as an Assemblyman reflects this philosophy.

In October 2018, he organized more than 20 labor groups, nonprofits and community leaders to call for a one-time cancellation of student debt and outlined the economic rationale and financial mechanisms for how it could be executed.

He was also the first elected official in New York to speak out against providing taxpayer-funded incentives to lure Amazon to New York City. On November 9, 2018 he and Professor Zephyr Teachout published an op-ed in The New York Times which warned of the consequences of locating a big corporation like Amazon in New York.

He went on to lead the #PeopleOverCorporations agenda, calling for an end to corporate welfare and repurposing of taxpayers' money to liberate New Yorkers from a lifetime of debt.

Small business advocacy 
Kim has worked with state legislators to pass a bill expanding access to small loans and seed funding for micro-businesses, and sought to create a fund in the 2017 State Budget to help small businesses in New York struggling to comply with increasingly burdensome regulations.

He has introduced legislation to create an entity within the New York State Department of Financial Services called the “State Office of Financial Services for Immigrants.” The purpose of the office would be to foster financial literacy among recent immigrant communities; assist recent immigrants with navigating mainstream financial institutions as they seek to borrow, lend or invest; and help recent immigrant build their credit score and history.

Kim has also introduced legislation to create the first-in-the-nation Office of Financial Resilience, which would work to reverse the cycle of debt under which so many New York families are living.

Nail salon law 
In the summer of 2015, following an investigative report by The New York Times, Kim helped to draft a measure to improve the conditions in the nail salon industry. The law Kim passed created a trainee nail specialist program and modified the Secretary of State’s enforcement of licensing requirements. Soon after, however, Governor Andrew Cuomo called a state of emergency and unilaterally implemented other requirements, such as wage bonds for nail salons, that were not part of the new law. These additional requirements caused excessive hardships for small business owners in the industry, and many of them were forced to close their stores. Kim spoke out against the new unilateral mandates imposed by the governor, which were not part of the law their offices had worked on and agreed to. He subsequently introduced and became the primary sponsor of a bill to relieve the financial and economic burdens that small business owners, including those in the nail salon industry, were facing. As a result of his efforts, the bill passed both houses of the New York State Legislature, but the governor refused to sign it.

In November 2015, The New York Times initially published a report claiming Kim had changed positions on the nail salon issue as a result of campaign contributions, which he vigorously countered in a letter to the Times. Reason and Crain's New York Business each published stories examining the record and refuting the Times allegation that Kim had changed his position. In December 2015, the New York Times made a correction, stating that its report "included incorrect information about some political donations to Mr. Kim from the industry."

After the publication of The New York Times' nail salon investigative report, the validity of its claims about the industry soon came into doubt. Amid increased scrutiny, the accuracy of its reporting on nail salons was challenged by several media outlets. Richard Bernstein, a former New York Times reporter, expressed serious doubts about its claims of widespread abuses and "astonishingly low" wages, and showed that its translation and understanding of job ads in the industry, one of its key pieces of evidence, were either inaccurate or false. In October 2015, Reason published a three part re-reporting of the story by Jim Epstein, charging that the New York Times' series was filled with misquotes and factual errors with respect to both its claims of illegally low wages and of health hazards. In November 2015, the Times public editor concluded that the Times' exposé's "findings, and the language used to express them, should have been dialed back — in some instances substantially" and recommended that "The Times writer further follow-up stories, including some that re-examine its original findings and that take on the criticism from salon owners and others — not defensively but with an open mind."

Criticism of Andrew Cuomo

During the COVID-19 pandemic in New York, Kim was one of the few New York elected Democrats who questioned Governor Cuomo’s handling of infections in nursing homes and the reporting of deaths of nursing home residents. According to Kim, Cuomo threatened to "destroy" him if he did not retract or change his statements.

Personal life
Kim and his wife, Alison Tan, reside with their three daughters in Flushing, Queens.

On September 17, 2015, Kim tackled an alleged purse-snatcher, Daniel Fish, to the ground while walking to his office. He broke his own glasses as he took down and held the suspect until police arrived to arrest him. Subsequently, Kim stated that he believed the suspect was suffering from a mental health problem, and expressed hope that the individual was not simply punished but also given the help and treatment he needed. Kim said that the incident, and the efforts to understand how the would-be mugger ended up in that situation, gave him more insight into the importance of effective policies to address homelessness, mental health problems, and other long-term issues.

See also
 Korean Americans in New York City
 Koreatown, Long Island

References

External links

 Official Website for Ron Kim
 Assembly Member Website
 Ron Kim Tag for the Queens Courier

1979 births
21st-century American politicians
American politicians of Korean descent
Asian-American people in New York (state) politics
Baruch College alumni
Hamilton College (New York) alumni
Living people
Democratic Party members of the New York State Assembly
People from Flushing, Queens
Riverdale Country School alumni
South Korean emigrants to the United States